The Book of Leviticus (from , ; , , "And He called") is the third book of the Torah (the Pentateuch) and of the Old Testament, also known as the Third Book of Moses. Scholars generally agree that it developed over a long period of time, reaching its present form during the Persian Period, from 538–332 BC.

Most of its chapters (1–7, 11–27) consist of Yahweh's speeches to Moses, which Yahweh tells Moses to repeat to the Israelites. This takes place within the story of the Israelites' Exodus after they escaped Egypt and reached Mount Sinai (Exodus 19:1). The Book of Exodus narrates how Moses led the Israelites in building the Tabernacle (Exodus 35–40) with God's instructions (Exodus 25–31). In Leviticus, God tells the Israelites and their priests, Aaron and his sons, how to make offerings in the Tabernacle and how to conduct themselves while camped around the holy tent sanctuary. Leviticus takes place during the month or month-and-a-half between the completion of the Tabernacle (Exodus 40:17) and the Israelites' departure from Sinai (Numbers 1:1, 10:11).

The instructions of Leviticus emphasize ritual, legal, and moral practices rather than beliefs. Nevertheless, they reflect the world view of the creation story in Genesis 1 that God wishes to live with humans. The book teaches that faithful performance of the sanctuary rituals can make that possible, so long as the people avoid sin and impurity whenever possible. The rituals, especially the sin and guilt offerings, provide the means to gain forgiveness for sins (Leviticus 4–5) and purification from impurities (Leviticus 11–16) so that God can continue to live in the Tabernacle in the midst of the people.

Name 

The Greek expression is in turn a variant of the rabbinic Hebrew , "law of priests", as many of its laws relate to priests.

In Hebrew the book is called , from the opening of the book,  "And He  [God] called."

Structure
The outlines from commentaries are similar, though not identical; compare those of Wenham, Hartley, Milgrom, and Watts.

I. Laws on sacrifice (1:1–7:38)
A. Instructions for the laity on bringing offerings (1:1–6:7)
1–5. The types of offering: burnt, cereal, peace, purification, reparation (or sin) offerings (chapters 1–5)
B. Instructions for the priests (6:1–7:38)
1–6. The various offerings, with the addition of the priests' cereal offering (6:1–7:36)
7. Summary (7:37–38)
II. Institution of the priesthood (8:1–10:20)
A. Ordination of Aaron and his sons (chapter 8)
B. Aaron makes the first sacrifices (chapter 9)
C. Judgement on Nadab and Abihu (chapter 10)
III. Uncleanliness and its treatment (11:1–15:33)
A. Unclean animals (chapter 11)
B. Childbirth as a source of uncleanliness (chapter 12)
C. Unclean diseases (chapter 13)
D. Cleansing of diseases (chapter 14)
E. Unclean discharges (chapter 15)
IV. Day of Atonement: purification of the tabernacle from the effects of uncleanliness and sin (chapter 16)
V. Prescriptions for practical holiness (the Holiness Code, chapters 17–26)
A. Sacrifice and food (chapter 17)
B. Sexual behaviour (chapter 18)
C. Neighbourliness (chapter 19)
D. Grave crimes (chapter 20)
E. Rules for priests (chapter 21) 
F. Rules for eating sacrifices (chapter 22)
G. Festivals (chapter 23)
H. Rules for the tabernacle (chapter 24:1–9)
I. Blasphemy (chapter 24:10–23)
J. Sabbatical and Jubilee years (chapter 25)
K. Exhortation to obey the law: blessing and curse (chapter 26)
VI. Redemption of votive gifts (chapter 27)

Summary

Chapters 1–5 describe the various sacrifices from the sacrificers' point of view, although the priests are essential for handling the blood. Chapters 6–7 go over much the same ground, but from the point of view of the priest, who, as the one actually carrying out the sacrifice and dividing the "portions", needs to know how to do it. Sacrifices are between God, the priest, and the offerers, although in some cases the entire sacrifice is a single portion to God—i.e., burnt to ashes.

Chapters 8–10 describe how Moses consecrates Aaron and his sons as the first priests, the first sacrifices, and God's destruction of two of Aaron's sons for ritual offenses. The purpose is to underline the character of altar priesthood (i.e., those priests with power to offer sacrifices to God) as an Aaronite privilege, and the responsibilities and dangers of their position.

With sacrifice and priesthood established, chapters 11–15 instruct the lay people on purity (or cleanliness). Eating certain animals produces uncleanliness, as does giving birth; certain skin diseases (but not all) are unclean, as are certain conditions affecting walls and clothing (mildew and similar conditions); and genital discharges, including female menses and male gonorrhea, are unclean. The reasoning behind the food rules are obscure; for the rest the guiding principle seems to be that all these conditions involve a loss of "life force", usually but not always blood.

Chapter 16 concerns the Day of Atonement (though that phrase appears first in 23:27). This is the only day on which the High Priest is to enter the holiest part of the sanctuary, the holy of holies. He is to sacrifice a bull for the sins of the priests, and a goat for the sins of the laypeople. The priest is to send a second goat into the desert to "Azazel", bearing the sins of the whole people. Azazel may be a wilderness-demon, but its identity is mysterious.

Chapters 17–26 are the Holiness code. It begins with a prohibition on all slaughter of animals outside the Temple, even for food, and then prohibits a long list of sexual contacts and also child sacrifice. The "holiness" injunctions which give the code its name begin with the next section: there are penalties for the worship of Molech, consulting mediums and wizards, cursing one's parents and engaging in unlawful sex. Priests receive instruction on mourning rituals and acceptable bodily defects. The punishment for blasphemy is death, and there is the setting of rules for eating sacrifices; there is an explanation of the calendar, and there are rules for sabbatical and Jubilee years; there are rules for oil lamps and bread in the sanctuary; and there are rules for slavery. The code ends by telling the Israelites they must choose between the law and prosperity on the one hand, or, on the other, horrible punishments, the worst of which will be expulsion from the land.

Chapter 27 is a disparate and probably late addition telling about persons and things serving as dedication to the Lord and how one can redeem, instead of fulfill, vows.

Composition

The majority of scholars have concluded that the Pentateuch received its final form during the Persian period (538–332 BC). Nevertheless, Leviticus had a long period of growth before reaching that form.

The entire composition of the book of Leviticus is Priestly literature. Most scholars see chapters 1–16 (the Priestly code) and chapters 17–26 (the Holiness code) as the work of two related schools, but while the Holiness material employs the same technical terms as the Priestly code, it broadens their meaning from pure ritual to the theological and moral, turning the ritual of the Priestly code into a model for the relationship of Israel to Yahweh: as the tabernacle, which is apart from uncleanliness, becomes holy by the presence of Yahweh, so he will dwell among Israel when Israel receives purification (becomes holy) and separates from other peoples. The ritual instructions in the Priestly code apparently grew from priests giving instruction and answering questions about ritual matters; the Holiness code (or H) used to be a separate document, later becoming part of Leviticus, but it seems better to think of the Holiness authors as editors who worked with the Priestly code and actually produced Leviticus as is now extant.

Themes

Sacrifice and ritual
Many scholars argue that the rituals of Leviticus have a theological meaning concerning Israel's relationship with its God. Jacob Milgrom was especially influential in spreading this view. He maintained that the priestly regulations in Leviticus expressed a rational system of theological thought. The writers expected them to be put into practice in Israel's temple, so the rituals would express this theology as well, as well as ethical concern for the poor. Milgrom also argued that the book's purity regulations (chapters 11–15) have a basis in ethical thinking. Many other interpreters have followed Milgrom in exploring the theological and ethical implications of Leviticus's regulations (e.g., Marx, Balentine), though some have questioned how systematic they really are. Ritual, therefore, is not taking a series of actions for their own sake, but a means of maintaining the relationship between God, the world, and humankind.

Kehuna (Jewish priesthood)

The main function of the priests is service at the altar, and only the sons of Aaron are priests in the full sense. (Ezekiel also distinguishes between altar-priests and lower Levites, but in Ezekiel the altar-priests are sons of Zadok instead of sons of Aaron; many scholars see this as a remnant of struggles between different priestly factions in First Temple times, finding resolution by the Second Temple into a hierarchy of Aaronite altar-priests and lower-level Levites, including singers, gatekeepers and the like).

In chapter 10, God kills Nadab and Abihu, the oldest sons of Aaron, for offering "strange incense". Aaron has two sons left. Commentators have read various messages in the incident: a reflection of struggles between priestly factions in the post–Exilic period (Gerstenberger); or a warning against offering incense outside the Temple, where there might be the risk of invoking strange gods (Milgrom). In any case, there has been a pollution of the sanctuary by the bodies of the two dead priests, leading into the next theme, holiness.

Uncleanliness and purity
Ritual purity is essential for an Israelite to be able to approach Yahweh and remain part of the community. Uncleanliness threatens holiness; Chapters 11–15 review the various causes of uncleanliness and describe the rituals which will restore cleanliness; one is to maintain cleanliness through observation of the rules on sexual behaviour, family relations, land ownership, worship, sacrifice, and observance of holy days.

Yahweh dwells with Israel in the holy of holies. All of the priestly ritual focuses on Yahweh and the construction and maintenance of a holy space, but sin generates impurity, as do everyday events such as childbirth and menstruation; impurity pollutes the holy dwelling place. Failure to purify the sacred space ritually could result in God's leaving, which would be disastrous.

Infectious diseases in chapter 13 
In chapter 13, God instructs Moses and Aaron on how to identify infectious diseases and deal with them accordingly. The most common translation is that these infectious diseases are leprosy, however, what is described in chapter 13 does not represent a typical manifestation of leprosy. Modern dermatology shows that many of the infectious diseases in chapter 13 were likely dermatophytoses, a group of highly contagious skin diseases.

The infectious disease of the chin described in verses 29–37 seems to be Tinea barbae in men or Tinea faciei in women; the infectious disease described in verses 29–37 (as resulting in hair loss and eventual baldness) seems to be Tinea capitis (Favus). Verses 1–17 seem to describe Tinea corporis.

The Hebrew word  in verses 38–39 is translated as tetter or freckles, likely because translators did not know what it meant at the time, and thus, translated it incorrectly. Later translations identify it as talking about vitiligo; however, vitiligo is not an infectious disease. The disease, described as healing itself and leaving white patches after infection, is likely to be pityriasis versicolor (tinea versicolor). Tetter originally referred to an outbreak, which later evolved meaning ringworm-like lesions. Therefore, a common name for Tinea pedis (athlete's foot) was Cantlie's foot tetter. In addition, verses 18–23 describe infections after scald, and verses 24–28 describe infections after burn.

Atonement

Through sacrifice, the priest "makes atonement" for sin and the offeror receives forgiveness (but only if Yahweh accepts the sacrifice). Atonement rituals involve the pouring or sprinkling of blood as the symbol of the life of the victim: the blood has the power to wipe out or absorb the sin. The two-part division of the book structurally reflects the role of atonement: chapters 1–16 call for the establishment of the institution for atonement, and chapters 17–27 call for the life of the atoned community in holiness.

Holiness
The consistent theme of chapters 17–26 is in the repetition of the phrase, "Be holy, for I the Lord your God am holy." Holiness in ancient Israel and the Hebrew Bible had a different meaning than in contemporary usage: it might have been regarded as the essence of Yahweh, an invisible but physical and potentially dangerous force. Specific objects, or even days, can be holy, but they derive holiness from being connected with Yahweh—the seventh day, the tabernacle, and the priests all derive their holiness from him. As a result, Israel had to maintain its own holiness in order to live safely alongside God.

The need for holiness is for the possession of the Promised Land (Canaan), where the Jews will become a holy people: "You shall not do as they do in the land of Egypt where you dwelt, and you shall not do as they do in the land of Canaan to which I am bringing you...You shall do my ordinances and keep my statutes...I am the Lord, your God." (Leviticus 18:3).

Subsequent tradition 

Leviticus, as part of the Torah, became the law book of Jerusalem's Second Temple as well as of the Samaritan temple. Its influence is evident among the Dead Sea Scrolls, which included fragments of seventeen manuscripts of Leviticus dating from the 3rd to the 1st centuries BC. Many other Qumran scrolls cite the book, especially the Temple Scroll and 4QMMT.

Jews and Christians have not observed Leviticus's instructions for animal offerings since the 1st century AD, following the destruction of the Second Temple in Jerusalem in 70 AD. As there was no longer a Temple at which to offer animal sacrifices, Judaism pivoted towards prayer and the study of the Torah, eventually giving rise to Rabbinic Judaism. Nevertheless, Leviticus constitutes a major source of Jewish law and is traditionally the first book children learn in the Rabbinic system of education. There are two main Midrashim on Leviticus—the halakhic one (Sifra) and a more aggadic one (Vayikra Rabbah).

The New Testament, particularly the Epistle to the Hebrews, uses ideas and images from Leviticus to describe Christ as the high priest who offers his own blood as a sin offering. Therefore, Christians do not make animal offerings either, because as Gordon Wenham summarized: "With the death of Christ the only sufficient 'burnt offering' was offered once and for all, and therefore the animal sacrifices which foreshadowed Christ's sacrifice were made obsolete."

Christians generally have the view that the New Covenant supersedes the Old Testament's ritual laws, which includes many of the rules in Leviticus. Christians, therefore, do not usually follow Leviticus' rules regarding diet, purity, and agriculture. Christian teachings have differed, however, as to where to draw the line between ritual and moral regulations. In Homilies on Leviticus, the third century theologian, Origen, expounded on the qualities of priests as models for Christians to be perfect in everything, strict, wise and to examine themselves individually, forgive sins, and convert sinners (by words and by doctrine).

Judaism's weekly Torah portions in the Book of Leviticus 

For detailed contents, see:
 Vayikra, on Leviticus 1–5: Laws of the sacrifices
 Tzav, on Leviticus 6–8: Sacrifices, ordination of the priests
 Shemini, on Leviticus 9–11: Concecration of tabernacle, alien fire, dietary laws
 Tazria, on Leviticus 12–13: Childbirth, skin disease, clothing
 Metzora, on Leviticus 14–15: Skin disease, unclean houses, genital discharges
 Acharei Mot, on Leviticus 16–18: Yom Kippur, centralized offerings, sexual practices
 Kedoshim, on Leviticus 19–20: Holiness, penalties for transgressions
 Emor, on Leviticus 21–24: Rules for priests, holy days, lights and bread, a blasphemer
 Behar, on Leviticus 25–25: Sabbatical year, debt servitude limited
 Bechukotai, on Leviticus 26–27: Blessings and curses, payment of vows

See also
 613 commandments
 En-Gedi Scroll
 Paleo-Hebrew Leviticus scroll
 Liberty Bell – inscribed with a quotation from Leviticus

References

Bibliography

Translations of Leviticus
Leviticus at Bible gateway

Commentaries on Leviticus

Bamberger, Bernard Jacob The Torah: A Modern Commentary (1981),

General

External links

Online versions of Leviticus:

Hebrew:
 Leviticus at Mechon-Mamre (Jewish Publication Society translation)
 Leviticus (The Living Torah)  Rabbi Aryeh Kaplan's translation and commentary at Ort.org
 Vayikra–Levitichius (Judaica Press) translation [with Rashi's commentary] at Chabad.org
 ויקרא  Vayikra–Leviticus (Hebrew–English at Mechon-Mamre.org)
 Christian translations:
The Book of Leviticus, Douay Rheims Version, with Bishop Challoner Commentaries
Online Bible at GospelHall.org (King James Version)
Online Audio and Classic Bible at Bible-Book.org (King James Version)
 oremus Bible Browser (New Revised Standard Version)
 oremus Bible Browser (Anglicized New Revised Standard Version)
  Various versions

Related article:
 Book of Leviticus article (Jewish Encyclopedia)
 The Literary Structure of Leviticus (chaver.com)

Brief introduction
 Leviticus

 
7th-century BC books
6th-century BC books
5th-century BC books
4th-century BC books
Tabernacle and Temples in Jerusalem
3
The Exodus